The 2003–04 Eastern Counties Football League season was the 62nd in the history of Eastern Counties Football League a football competition in England.

Premier Division

The Premier Division featured 20 clubs which competed in the division last season, along with two new clubs, promoted from Division One:
Halstead Town
King's Lynn reserves

League table

Division One

Division One featured 17 clubs which competed in the division last season, along with four new clubs:
Ely City, relegated from the Premier Division
Harwich & Parkeston, relegated from the Premier Division
Ipswich Wanderers, relegated from the Premier Division
Kirkley, joined from the Anglian Combination

League table

References

External links
 Eastern Counties Football League

2003-04
2003–04 in English football leagues